Dimcho Belyakov (born 6 October 1971 in Gotse Delchev) is a former Bulgarian footballer who played as a forward. In the late 1990s he also received a call-up to the Bulgaria national team. In this time Belyakov made his debut under manager Hristo Bonev against Slovakia on 11 March 1997.

Honours
 Bulgarian League champion: 1997–98, 1998–99
 Bulgarian Cup winner: 2003–04
 Bulgarian League top scorer: 1998–99 (21 goals)
 Bulgarian Cup finalist: 1998–99

References

External links
 

1971 births
Living people
Bulgarian footballers
Bulgaria international footballers
People from Gotse Delchev
PFC Belasitsa Petrich players
PFC Litex Lovech players
Gaziantepspor footballers
1. FC Nürnberg players
Rot-Weiß Oberhausen players
PFC Pirin Gotse Delchev players
First Professional Football League (Bulgaria) players
Second Professional Football League (Bulgaria) players
2. Bundesliga players
Süper Lig players
Bulgarian expatriate footballers
Expatriate footballers in Turkey
Expatriate footballers in Germany
Macedonian Bulgarians
Association football forwards
Sportspeople from Blagoevgrad Province